Al-Watani is a Saudi Arabian football team based in Tabuk. The club was established in 1959.

Al-Watani has achieved promotion to the Saudi Premier League as the champion of the Saudi First Division during the 2006–07 season.

Honours
Saudi First Division (Level 2)
Winners (1): 2006–07

Current squad

External links
Al-Watani Club at Soccerway

Football clubs in Saudi Arabia
Association football clubs established in 1959
1959 establishments in Saudi Arabia
Football clubs in Tabuk, Saudi Arabia